Ian Kenneth Cole (born 31 October 1947) is a former Australian politician.

In 1974, he was elected to the Tasmanian House of Assembly as a Labor member for Denison in a recount following Merv Everett's resignation to contest the Senate. He served as Deputy Chair of Committees, but was defeated at the following election in 1976.

References

1947 births
Living people
Members of the Tasmanian House of Assembly
Australian Labor Party members of the Parliament of Tasmania